William McDonald (1883 – after 1914) was a Scottish professional footballer who played as a wing half in the Scottish League for Kilmarnock and in the English Football League for Leeds City. He was a member of the Brighton & Hove Albion team that won the 1909–10 Southern League title and the 1910 FA Charity Shield.

References

1883 births
Year of death missing
Scottish footballers
Association football wing halves
Nithsdale Wanderers F.C. players
Kilmarnock F.C. players
Lanemark F.C. players
Brighton & Hove Albion F.C. players
Leeds City F.C. players
Scottish Junior Football Association players
Scottish Football League players
Southern Football League players
English Football League players